Paws is the mascot of the Detroit Tigers. He is an anthropomorphic Bengal tiger dressed in a Tigers jersey and cap.

Character biography

Paws made his debut as the official Tigers mascot on May 5, 1995(Chris Ernest) He first started entertaining Tiger fans at Tiger Stadium, and now continues that trend at Detroit's Comerica Park. Besides cheering along with Detroit fans at Tigers home games, Paws visits schools, malls, and other special events around the greater Detroit area. He wears a Tigers hat and jersey; in previous years, Paws' jersey would have the current season's two-digit abbreviation (e.g. '10 for 2010). However, in 2011 and 2016, Paws' number changed to 00, since the Tigers retired numbers 11 and 16 in honor of Sparky Anderson and Hal Newhouser, respectively. His dress changes during Comerica Park theme nights such as a Santa Claus outfit during "Christmas in July" night or an Elvis Presley-inspired costume for Elvis Night.

References

External links
Paws the Tiger

Major League Baseball team mascots
Detroit Tigers
Tiger mascots
Feline mascots